is a national park in Nagasaki, Kumamoto, and Kagoshima Prefectures, Japan. Established in 1934, the park derives its name from Mount Unzen, an active volcano at the middle of the Shimabara Peninsula, and the Amakusa islands in the Yatsushiro Sea. The area is closely connected to the early history of Christianity in Japan, and the park encompasses numerous areas related to Kakure Kirishitan.

History
The park was established as the Unzen National Park in 1934 and, after extension, in 1956 renamed the Unzen-Amakusa National Park.

Related municipalities
 Kagoshima: Nagashima
 Kumamoto: Amakusa, Kami-Amakusa, Reihoku
 Nagasaki: Minamishimabara, Shimabara, Unzen

See also
 List of national parks of Japan
 Shimabara Rebellion
 Kakure Kirishitan
 Hidden Christian Sites in the Nagasaki Region

References

External links

  Unzen-Amakusa National Park
  Unzen-Amakusa National Park
 Map of Unzen-Amakusa National Park

National parks of Japan
Parks and gardens in Kagoshima Prefecture
Parks and gardens in Kumamoto Prefecture
Parks and gardens in Nagasaki Prefecture
Protected areas established in 1934
1934 establishments in Japan